This is a list of Croatian television related events from 1999.

Events
7 March - Doris Dragović is selected to represent Croatia at the 1999 Eurovision Song Contest with her song "Marija Magdalena". She is selected to be the seventh Croatian Eurovision entry during Dora held at the Jadran Film Studios in Zagreb.

Debuts

Television shows

Ending this year

Births

Deaths